Billy Curtis (born Luigi Curto; June 27, 1909 – November 9, 1988) was an American film and television actor with dwarfism, who had a 50-year career in the entertainment industry.

Career
The bulk of his work was in the western and science fiction genres, portraying a little person.  One of his early roles was uncredited as a Munchkin city father in The Wizard of Oz (1939). He had a featured role as part of the circus troupe in Alfred Hitchcock's Saboteur (1942). He also appeared in Superman and the Mole Men (1951), a B-Picture intended as the pilot for the Adventures of Superman TV series. Curtis followed up this role by playing yet another alien visitor in an episode of the last season in The Adventures of Superman television series, titled "Mister Zero". As the title character, he portrayed a stranded refugee from Mars who visits the Metropolis Daily Planet newspaper office, asking to be taken to Earth's leader.

Curtis's work in westerns included the Clint Eastwood feature High Plains Drifter (1973) in which he was featured as Mordecai, a friendly dwarf sympathetic to Eastwood's character. He also appeared in the Musical/Western The Terror of Tiny Town (1938). This film is, as far as is known, the world's only Western with an all-midget cast. Many of the actors in Tiny Town were part of a performing troupe called Singer's Midgets, who also played Munchkins in The Wizard of Oz. In 1973 he appeared as Arizona in an episode of Gunsmoke titled "Arizona Midnight". He had a starring role in American International Pictures' Little Cigars (1973), about a gang of small people on a crime spree.

Death 
Curtis died November 9, 1988, aged 79 in Dayton, Nevada of a heart attack.

Filmography

References

External links
 
 

 
 

1909 births
1988 deaths
20th-century American male actors
Male actors from Massachusetts
Actors with dwarfism
American male film actors
American male television actors
Actors from Springfield, Massachusetts